Amy Cassandra Brown Lyman (February 7, 1872 – December 5, 1959) was the eighth general president of the Relief Society of the Church of Jesus Christ of Latter-day Saints (LDS Church) from 1940 to 1945. Lyman also served a term as a member of the 14th Utah State Legislature from 1923 to 1924.

Early life
Amy Cassandra Brown was born in Pleasant Grove, Utah Territory on February 7, 1872, to John Brown and Margaret Zimmerman Brown. John Brown was a polygamist, and Amy Brown was the twenty-third of his twenty-five children. He was also a leader of the Mississippi Latter-day Saints.

Amy Brown attended high school at Brigham Young Academy (BYA) from 1888 to 1890. For part of her time at BYA, Brown lived in the home of Karl G. and Anna Meith Maeser. Maeser appointed Brown to head the Primary Department at BYA; she worked as a teacher at BYA from 1890 to 1894, and later taught elementary school in Salt Lake City for two years.

Marriage

At BYA she met Richard Lyman, her future husband who would become an LDS Church apostle in 1918. Brown and Lyman's plans to marry were postponed because the University of Michigan, where Lyman was studying, did not allow married students. After Lyman graduated in 1896, the couple was married in the Salt Lake Temple in a ceremony performed by Joseph F. Smith. The couple had two children, Wendell Brown and Margaret.

After their marriage, Richard Lyman became a professor of engineering at the University of Utah. Amy Lyman took classes from the university, including English and history. In 1902, the Lymans went to New York so that Richard could begin his graduate studies at Cornell University. On their way, they went to a summer session at the University of Chicago. While in Chicago, Lyman enrolled in a class on sociology. She became involved in Settlement House programs and associated with Jane Addams. After her husband graduated from Cornell University, the couple returned to Utah.

Prior to the Second World War, Lyman accompanied her husband to England where he presided over the church's European Mission from 1936 to 1938. In Europe, Lyman presided over women's organizations.

LDS Church service

Relief Society
Lyman became a member of the general board Relief Society in 1909. She served as both assistant secretary and, later, as general secretary-treasurer. In this role, she collected historical documents, while promoting the use of modern office machinery and practices, such as filing systems.

While on the general board, she established Social Service Department under Joseph F. Smith's authorization. From 1928 to 1940, Lyman was the first counselor to the president Louise Y. Robison in the Relief Society general presidency. As a counselor, she transferred stored wheat collected under Brigham Young to the General Welfare Program. She also assisted in the centennial celebration of Relief Society. Lyman succeeded Robison as president in 1940 and served until 1945.

Lyman received numerous honors including election to the Social Science Honor Society of America, the Distinguished Alumnus Award from Brigham Young University, honorary membership in the American Association of Mental Deficiency, and the Honorary Life Membership Award from the Utah State Conference of Social Work.

In 1943, the First Presidency discovered that Richard Lyman had carried on a relationship with another woman since 1925  for which he was  ex-communicated on November 12, 1943, for violations of the law of chastity. Due to the marital problems resulting from her husband's infidelity, Lyman requested release from her union with him. She was honorably released on April 6, 1945, and was succeeded by her second counselor, Belle S. Spafford.

Social welfare department
Part of Lyman's work in the Relief Society included her contributions to the social welfare department of the Church of Jesus Christ of Latter-day Saints. Lyman studied at the University of Colorado and earned a certificate in social service. She was a member of the State Council on Defense in Utah and was chair of its social service committee. She was selected to be a delegate to the National Conference of Social Work in June 1917.

In 1919, Lyman founded and headed the Relief Society Social Service Department as part of the church's Relief Society program. She would head the department for 16 years. In 1973, the organization became a corporation separate from the church's Relief Society and was renamed LDS Social Services. (The organization has since been renamed Family Services.)

As head of the Social Service Department, Lyman created a training program in which stake delegates attended classes in family welfare work. They would then return to their stakes and to teach these lessons to the members of the church. Over 4,000 students were trained through the curriculum she established for those classes.

Utah House of Representatives
Lyman served a term as a member of the 14th Utah State Legislature from 1923-1924. As a representative, she pushed for statewide support of the federal Sheppard–Towner Act, which provided for federally financed instruction in maternal and infant health care and gave matching funds to individual U.S. states to build women's health care clinics. The Sheppard–Towner Act was one of the most significant achievements of Progressive-era maternalist reformers.

Other contributions
Throughout her life, Lyman was involved with the Red Cross. She attended a Red Cross training seminar on welfare work in Colorado in 1917, and by 1918 she was a trustee and vice-president of her community clinic, organizer of the Municipal Department of Health and Charity, chairperson of the Family Consultation Committee of the Red Cross and the vice-president of State Welfare Commission. She also participated in national organizations like the American Child Hygiene Association, Home Services Institute, American Association for Mental Deficiency and the National Tuberculosis Association. Under her influence, Brigham Young University created its first classes in family welfare work. She was also involved with the National Council of Women. She contributed to the establishment of the Utah State Training School in 1929, for whom she was a trustee for eleven years.

Lyman raised her granddaughter, Amy Kathryn Lyman (daughter of Lyman's son Wendell), after Lyman's daughter-in-law was killed in 1924. Her son Wendell died by suicide in 1933. Her husband was later re-baptized into the church in 1954. Lyman died on December 5, 1959 in the house of her daughter where she had been recovering from a fall.

Works
Lyman wrote a number of articles for the Relief Society Magazine.

References

Further reading
 Hall, Dave. A Faded Legacy: Amy Brown Lyman and Mormon Women's Activism, 1872–1959 (University of Utah Press, 2015). xvi, 266 pp. 
Amy Brown Lyman (1945). In Retrospect: Autobiography of Amy Brown Lyman (Salt Lake City, Utah: General Board of Relief Society).
Richard S, Van Waggoner and Steven C. Walker. A Book of Mormons bio of Amy Brown Lyman

External links
 Amy Brown Lyman papers, MSS 316 at L. Tom Perry Special Collections, Harold B. Lee Library, Brigham Young University

1872 births
People from American Fork, Utah
American Mormon missionaries in the United Kingdom
Brigham Young Academy alumni
Brigham Young Academy faculty
General Presidents of the Relief Society
Members of the Utah House of Representatives
Mormon missionaries in Europe
Smith family (Latter Day Saints)
People from Pleasant Grove, Utah
Female Mormon missionaries
Women state legislators in Utah
20th-century Mormon missionaries
1959 deaths
Counselors in the General Presidency of the Relief Society
Mission presidents (LDS Church)
American leaders of the Church of Jesus Christ of Latter-day Saints
20th-century American women politicians
20th-century American politicians